Canaxır (also, Dzha nakhar and Dzhanak hyr) is a village and municipality in the Khachmaz Rayon of Azerbaijan.  It has a population of 713.  The municipality consists of the villages of Canaxır, Bəyqışlaq, and Mehrəlliqışlaq.

References 

Populated places in Khachmaz District